Eremochares is a genus of wasp in the family Crabronidae.

Species 
The genus Eremochares contains 6 extant species:

 Eremochares clypevariatus Yan and Ma, 2015
 Eremochares dives (Brullé, 1833)
 Eremochares ferghanicus (Gussakovskij, 1930)
 Eremochares kohlii (Gussakovskij, 1928)
 Eremochares luteus (Taschenberg, 1869)
 Eremochares mirabilis (Gussakovskij, 1928)

References 

Sphecidae
Apoidea genera